Loni Richardson (born November 11, 1970) is an American former stock car racing driver from Paris, Texas. Richardson competed in 19 NASCAR Craftsman Truck Series races between 2001 and 2004, earning a best finish of 20th at Kentucky Speedway in 2003.

Racing career

Motorsports career results

NASCAR
(key) (Bold – Pole position awarded by qualifying time. Italics – Pole position earned by points standings or practice time. * – Most laps led.)

Craftsman Truck Series

References

External links
 

Living people
1970 births
NASCAR drivers
People from Paris, Texas
Racing drivers from Texas